"Red Lenses" is a song by the Canadian rock band Rush. It was released on their 1984 album Grace Under Pressure. In the album's liner notes, the song's title and lyrics are in lower case only.

Composition and recording
The song was composed in the key of C-sharp minor, and is played in common time.

News stories from the Toronto-based newspaper The Globe and Mail inspired the song's lyrics.

Drummer and lyricist Neil Peart said of the song:  This was probably the hardest song I ever worked on, in spite of the pleasure it gave me. It went through so many rewrites and changed its title so many times. Each little image was juggled around and I just fought for the right words to put each little phrase and to make it sound exactly right to me, so that it sounded a little bit nonsensical. I wanted to get that kind of jabberwocky word game thing happening with it, and also there are little things going on that your mind sort of catches without identifying, like a lot of poetic devices. You take the number of words that sound the same or start with the same letter or whatever. You just certainly don't start in the middle of it and go, "Oh, that's alliteration".

Lee said in an interview: "There are a couple of tracks on the last few records where just before the fade-out, I try to put my two cents in (laughs). I did that on 'Red Lenses'. As it's fading out, I like to get loose -- it's almost a reaction to being so structured through the whole song".

Reception
Although Odyssey thought it was the worst song on Grace Under Pressure, they rated "Red Lenses" 4/5, and wrote that it was the album's most experimental track. They also praised the drumming in the song, and thought "Red Lenses" was reminiscent of the Irish rock band U2.

Christopher Thelen of The Daily Vault wrote that the song "adds a dimension of funk to Rush", and that Geddy Lee's bass work is perfectly suited to the genre.

Ultimate Classic Rock ranked the song number 75 on their list of "All 167 Rush Songs Ranked Worst to Best" and wrote: "This one's a mixed bag, with Lee throwing down on some campy synth-horns that probably made Lifeson – and a lot of Rush fans – furious. But there are too many distinct moments to write it off, like Lee's funky slap-bass; some spooky, Talking Heads-ish synth and Peart's tightly wound tom fills on his Simmons SDS-V kit".

References 

1984 songs
Rush (band) songs
Songs written by Neil Peart
Songs written by Geddy Lee
Songs written by Alex Lifeson